"The Shock of the Lightning" is a song by English rock band Oasis. It is the fourth track from the band's seventh studio album, Dig Out Your Soul (2008). The song was released as the first single from the album on 29 September 2008. It received its first airplay on 15 August 2008 on multiple UK and Irish radio stations including the Ian Dempsey Breakfast show on Today FM in Ireland, BBC 6 Music by Shaun Keaveny, and by Chris Moyles on BBC Radio 1. Moyles was joined by Noel Gallagher on 15 August 2008 to make a remix.

Release
Noel said of the song: "If 'The Shock of the Lightning' sounds instant and compelling to you, it's because it was written dead fast. And recorded dead fast. 'The Shock of the Lightning' basically is the demo. And it has retained its energy. And there's a lot to be said for that, I think. The first time you record something is always the best". It was described by NME as "a massively improved version of 'It's Gettin' Better (Man!!)'" and featuring "love is a litany/a magical mystery" as the song's chorus.

The single is the first Oasis song to feature a remix on a studio release. The B-side is a remixed version of the album track "Falling Down" by The Chemical Brothers, with whom Noel has worked in the past. However, a promo release of Oasis' cover of "Cum On Feel the Noize" contained the "Lynchmob Beats Mix" of "Champagne Supernova" by Brandon Lynch that was also re-released as a stand-alone promo for Stop the Clocks. Consequently, this is their first official CD single release that does not contain a new track as a B-side.

Reception
On 30 July 2008, the official Oasis website posted a Dig Out Your Soul trailer which contained a 23-second clip of the intro to "The Shock of the Lightning" as well as a 20-second clip of the drum solo. On 15 August 2008, the song received its first airplay on The Chris Moyles Show on BBC Radio 1 with Noel Gallagher present. Noel said of the song on Shaun Keaveny's Radio 6 show, "It's a driving, pumping, pop, rock 'n' roll masterpiece". In NME, the song was named as 'song of the week' and received a score of 9/10, despite being referred to as "only the fifth best song on Dig Out Your Soul".

"The Shock of the Lightning" entered the UK Singles Chart at number 3, becoming the band's first lead single since their debut, "Supersonic", to fail to reach number 1 in their homeland. It peaked behind Pink's number 1 single "So What" and "Sex on Fire" by Kings of Leon at number 2 during the week of its physical release. It is still awaiting a Silver certification in the UK, making it their only lead single not to have reached this milestone. The song also reached number 12 on the Billboard Hot Modern Rock chart in the United States, making it their most successful single there since "Don't Go Away", which peaked on the chart at number 5 in 1998. It also reached number 93 on the Billboard Hot 100, their first song to chart on the Hot 100 since "Don't Look Back in Anger" in 1996.

Music video
The music video for the song (directed by Julian House and Julian Gibbs) debuted on the band's official site on 25 August at 17:30 (UK time) and was broadcast on Channel 4 at 23:40. The video depicts Liam singing and the occasional appearance of the rest of the band, intercut with stock footage related to the album's artwork. The opening shot of the video of silhouetted heads is a reference to the cover of the Rolling Stones compilation record Hot Rocks 1964-1971, an idea previously used in the video for Super Furry Animals song "(Drawing) Rings Around the World".

Accolades
The track was number 96 in NMEs 100 Tracks of the Decade feature and was the only Oasis song to feature in the list.

Track listings
All songs were written by Noel Gallagher.

CD and 7-inch
 "The Shock of the Lightning" – 5:02
 "Falling Down" (Chemical Brothers remix) – 4:32

iTunes and Oasisinet exclusive bundle
 "The Shock of the Lightning" – 5:02
 "Falling Down" (Chemical Brothers remix) – 4:32
 "The Shock of the Lightning" (music video)

Japanese edition
 "The Shock of the Lightning" – 5:03
 "The Shock of the Lightning" (The Jagz Kooner remix) – 6:38
 "Lord Don't Slow Me Down" – 3:18

Personnel
 Liam Gallagher – lead vocals, tambourine
 Noel Gallagher – electric guitar, backing vocals, electronics
 Gem Archer – electric guitar, keyboards
 Andy Bell – bass and electric guitars
 Zak Starkey – drums

Charts

Weekly charts

Year-end charts

References

2008 singles
2008 songs
Number-one singles in Scotland
Oasis (band) songs
Song recordings produced by Dave Sardy
Songs written by Noel Gallagher